Branislav Tomić (born 12 February 1995) is a Serbian professional footballer who plays as a midfielder for Radnički Niš.

Club career

Borac Čačak
As a member of youth school, Tomić signed a scholarship contract with Borac Čačak on 24 August 2012. For the 2014–15, he was loaned to Polet Ljubić. In summer 2015, he was on trial with Zeta, but later he returned in Borac Čačak and was licensed for the first team. He made his SuperLiga debut in 8th fixture of the 2015–16 season, against Jagodina under coach Nenad Lalatović. After he made 5 league and 1 cup appearance until the end of first-half season, he was loaned to Polet Ljubić for the second half of season on dual registration. He was also played the last fixture match of the season, against Voždovac. Tomić started the 2016–17 season with his home club, but after he did not make any official appearances, he terminated the contract and left the contract.

Metalac Gornji Milanovac
In summer 2016, Tomić joined Metalac Gornji Milanovac and signed a three-year contract. He made his debut for new club in a cup match against Žarkovo. He also made a league debut for new club in 10 fixture of the 2016–17 season against Partizan.

Career statistics

References

External links
 Branislav Tomić stats at utakmica.rs 
 
 

1995 births
Living people
Sportspeople from Čačak
Association football midfielders
Serbian footballers
FK Borac Čačak players
FK Polet Ljubić players
FK Metalac Gornji Milanovac players
OFK Bačka players
FK Inđija players
FK Novi Pazar players
FK Radnički Niš players
Serbian SuperLiga players
Serbian First League players